Shawkat Ali (1918–1975) was a politician and leader of the Language Movement in Bangladesh.

Shawkat Ali, Shaukat Ali, and Shawqat Ali may also refer to:

Maulana Shaukat Ali (1873–1939), Indian Muslim nationalist
Shawkat Ali (novelist) (1936–2018), Bangladeshi novelist
Shawkat Ali (politician) (1937–2020), politician and deputy speaker of Bangladesh
Shaukat Ali (1944–2021), Pakistani folk singer
Shaukat Ali (cricketer), Pakistani cricketer
Nabeel Shaukat Ali (born 1989), Pakistani singer
Shokat Ali (politician) (Pakistani Politician) NA-33 Peshawar

People with the names
Shawkat Ali Emon, Bangladeshi music composer
Shawkat Ali Khan (1926–2006), Bangladeshi politician
Shaukat Ali Yousafzai, Pakistani politician

See also
Alia Shawkat (born 1989), American actress
Shawkat